Alfred Dunhill Limited (known and stylised as dunhill) is a British luxury goods brand, specialising in ready-to-wear, custom and bespoke menswear, leather goods, and accessories. The company is based in Westminster, City of Westminster, London, where it also owns and operates a leather workshop. Dunhill is currently owned by Richemont Holdings Limited and managed by CEO Laurent Malecaze.

History

Early history 
Alfred Dunhill Limited was developed by Alfred Dunhill (1872–1959) after he inherited his father's saddlery business on London's Euston Road at the age of 21 in 1893. Alfred Dunhill developed a line of automobile accessories called "Dunhill's Motorities". This first collection included car horns and lamps, leather overcoats, goggles, picnic sets and timepieces, which provided the company with the strap line of "Everything But The Motor". Within a few years, the business moved towards the luxury market with the opening of two Dunhill Motorities stores in Mayfair. In 1904 Dunhill had patented a "Windshield Pipe" to help a driver smoke while driving. Dunhill's first tobacconist and pipe shop opened in 1907 on Duke Street. Dunhill retired from the business in the 1920s, leaving the position of managing director and president to his brother Alfred-Henry, then daughter Mary, and finally his grandson Richard.

Later history 
In the mid-1950s, Dunhill produced one of the first butane gas lighters. This design has remained relatively unchanged since and was regularly used by James Bond in both print and on the screen. By the late 1970s, Alfred Dunhill was offering a range of 3,500 luxury products in more than 20 stores round the world. Alfred Dunhill began sponsoring golf tournaments in 1985, with the first annual Dunhill Cup golf tournament, following up in 2001 with its successor, the Alfred Dunhill Links Championship. Dunhill also released fragrances, with a ten-year licensing agreement with Inter Parfums, Inc. made in 2013, replacing a prior agreement with Procter & Gamble.

See also

 Dunhill (cigar)
 List of pen types, brands and companies

Bibliography 
 Barker, Christian. "High Gear". August Man magazine (December 2006)

 Foulkes, Nick (2006). Dunhill By Design: A Very English Story .

References

External links

 Official website
 "A History of Dunhill Lighters" on John Flores Graphics website

Clothing brands of the United Kingdom
Luxury brands
High fashion brands
Richemont brands
Fountain pen and ink manufacturers
Cigarette lighter brands
British suit makers
Manufacturing companies based in London
Clothing companies established in 1893
1893 establishments in England
British brands